Speckkuchen is a type of quiche, a specialty of northern Hesse, Germany. It is a bacon pie/flan with a rye flour crust on the base and made with eggs, and in some villages contains high proportion of leeks or onions. It is popular as a quick snack in Kassel, especially on market days, sold at food stalls and bakeries. As with many regional specialties, every village and every baker has his own Speckkuchen recipe.

References

Hessian cuisine
Bacon dishes
Meat dishes